Anton Andreyevich Antonov (born 2 February 1998) is a Russian football player. He plays for FC Chernomorets Novorossiysk.

Club career
He made his debut in the Russian Professional Football League for FC Dynamo-2 Moscow on 20 July 2016 in a game against FC Tekstilshchik Ivanovo.

He made his Russian Football National League debut for FC Neftekhimik Nizhnekamsk on 7 July 2019 in a game against FC Mordovia Saransk.

References

External links
 
 Profile by Russian Professional Football League
 

1998 births
Sportspeople from Krasnodar
Living people
Russian footballers
Association football midfielders
FC Dynamo Moscow reserves players
MFK Zemplín Michalovce players
FK Slavoj Trebišov players
FC Urozhay Krasnodar players
FC Neftekhimik Nizhnekamsk players
FC Chernomorets Novorossiysk players
Russian Second League players
Slovak Super Liga players
2. Liga (Slovakia) players
Russian First League players
Russian expatriate footballers
Expatriate footballers in Slovakia
Russian expatriate sportspeople in Slovakia